Coffee cake may refer to a sponge cake flavored with coffee or, in the United States, a sweet cake intended to be eaten with coffee or tea (similar to tea cake). A coffee-flavored cake is typically baked in a circular shape with two layers separated by coffee butter icing, which may also cover the top of the cake. Walnuts are a common addition.

Varieties

American coffee cake
Contemporary coffee cakes in the United States rarely contain coffee. American coffee cakes are typically presented in a single layer, flavoured with either fruit or cinnamon, and leavened with baking soda (or baking powder), which results in a more cake-like texture, or yeast, which results in a more bread-like texture. They may be loaf-shaped or baked in a Bundt or tube pan. They may also feature a streusel or simple glaze topping, if any. Streusel is German for "sprinkle" or "strew" and refers to the popular crumbly topping of butter, flour, sugar. Sour cream is also sometimes used in traditional American coffee cakes to both add a tart flavor and activate baking soda used as a leavening agent.

American coffee cakes may have originated from the concept of kaffeeklatsch brought by German immigrants. Indeed, a variety of crumb cake containing flour, sugar, butter, cinnamon, and sometimes oats or nuts sprinkled over the coffee cake batter before it is baked, is sometimes eaten with coffee and bears resemblance to the German Streuselkuchen.

Applesauce cake
Applesauce cake is variety of American coffee cake.

History of American coffee cake 
In the 17th century, Northern/Central Europeans are thought to have come up with the idea of eating sweet cakes while drinking coffee. As the region's countries were already known for their sweet yeast breads, the introduction of coffee in Europe led to the understanding that cakes were a great complement to the beverage. Immigrants from countries such as Germany and Scandinavia adjusted their recipes to their own liking and brought them to America. Though the cakes varied, they all contained ingredients such as yeast, flour, dried fruit, and sweet spices. However, over time, the coffee cake recipes have changed as cheese, sugared fruit, yogurt, soured cream, have been used, leading to a denser, more cake-like structure. In the th century, American cooks also used coffee as an ingredient to thriftily use up leftovers, reducing waste, and flavor the cake. The invention of pasteurization in America following World War I also led to the creation of a new kind of coffee cake, called sour cream coffee cake. Coffee cake is referenced in literary material as early as 1850 with references to gugelhupf going back to 1763.

See also

 Amish friendship bread – has characteristics of both pound cake and American coffee cake
 Bundt cake – a ring shaped cake similar to Gugelhupf
 Gooey butter cake – generally served as a type of American coffee cake and not as a formal dessert cake
 Gugelhupf – sometimes served with coffee, during coffee breaks
 List of brunch foods
 List of cakes
 Teacake
 Tiramisu – a popular coffee flavored Italian dessert

References

Further reading

Cakes
Jewish baked goods
Jewish American cuisine
Sweet breads
Ashkenazi Jewish cuisine
German cakes